Syndicalist Group Movement functioned as the youth wing of the Central Organisation of the Workers of Sweden between 1958 and 1970. The movement was mainly, but not exclusively, academic and had local units in Gothenburg, Lund, Stockholm and Uppsala. The movement published the magazine . When  evolved into an independent and more mainstream leftist publication that led to much dissent within the movement, one of the causes of its dissolution.

Politics of Sweden
Anarchist organizations in Sweden
Anarcho-syndicalism
Defunct anarchist organizations in Europe